The Westin Palace Madrid (Spanish: Hotel Palace) is a luxury hotel located at Centro in Madrid, Spain, on the Carrera de San Jerónimo, with exteriors to Plaza de Cánovas del Castillo, Calle del Duque de Medinaceli, and Plaza de las Cortes.

History
The Palace Hotel was developed by Belgian entrepreneur Georges Marquet by personal suggestion of King Alfonso XIII. Designed by the Monnoyer Studio and architect Leon Eduard Ferrés i Puig, the 800-room Palace was the largest hotel in Europe, and was constructed with a new material: reinforced concrete. The cornerstone was laid on 9 March 1911 and the hotel was built over a period of eighteen months, welcoming its first guests on 21 September 1912. The grand opening was celebrated on 12 October 1912. The land had cost 1.5 million Pesetas, while the hotel itself cost 15 million Pesetas.

The Palace was the first hotel in Spain (and only the second in the world) to have a bathroom in each guest room. It was also the first hotel in Spain to have a telephone in each room.  Notable guests of the hotel during its first few decades were Igor Stravinsky, Pablo Picasso, Marie Curie, Mata Hari, Josephine Baker, Buster Keaton, Richard Strauss, Federico García Lorca, Luis Buñuel and Salvador Dalí. During the Spanish Civil War from 1936-9, the Palace became a military hospital. The famous glass-domed lounge was used as an operating theatre, due to the abundant natural light. After the war, the hotel was restored in 1939 at a cost of four million Pesetas.

The basement of the building was famous in Madrid for providing diverse services, such as dance halls known as "The del Palace", a jazz lounge known as "Rector's Club", and a brewery known as "La Brasserie". In the 40s, Cine Palace opened here.

After World War II, the Palace welcomed such guests as Ernest Hemingway, Orson Welles, Lauren Bacall, Rita Hayworth, Ava Gardner, and the Duke and Duchess of Windsor. In 1972, one entire floor of the hotel temporarily became the embassy of the People's Republic of China, as it re-established diplomatic relations with Spain. Henry Kissinger met with the Chinese at the hotel during this time, paving the way for the re-establishment of relations between China and the US.

Georges Marquet's heirs sold the Palace to Spanish businessman Enrique Maso in 1977. During the February 23, 1981 coup, the hotel's general manager's office was taken over by members of the interim government, while over 200 international journalists filled the hotel. The Spanish Socialist Workers' Party celebrated their landslide victory in the 1982 elections in the hotel. Maso sold the hotel in 1989 to CIGA hotels, an Italian luxury chain owned by the Aga Khan. The hotel hosted participants in the Madrid Conference of 1991 between Israel and the Palestinians. ITT Sheraton purchased CIGA in 1995, and placed the hotel in its ITT Sheraton Luxury Collection. Starwood Hotels purchased Sheraton in 1997, and the hotel became part of its Luxury Collection division. The hotel was declared Bien de Interés Cultural in 1999. Starwood moved the hotel to its Westin Hotels division in 2001, renaming the property The Westin Palace Madrid. The hotel was home to the first meeting of the Club of Madrid in 2001, and closed for three days to host international heads of state including Mikhail Gorbachev and Bill Clinton. In 2005, Starwood sold the hotel to Host Marriott as part of a package of 38 international hotel properties, for $4.1 billion. Westin continues to operate the hotel under a long-term contract.

References

External links
 

Westin hotels
Hotels in Madrid
Bien de Interés Cultural landmarks in Madrid
Art Nouveau hotels
Hotel buildings completed in 1912
Hotels established in 1912
1912 establishments in Spain
Alfonso XIII of Spain
Buildings and structures in Cortes neighborhood, Madrid